A constitutional referendum was held in Saint Helena on 25 May 2005. The referendum was ordered by the British government in March 2005, with the proposed new constitution introducing ministerial government. However, it was rejected by 53% of voters.

Results

References

Constitutional, 2005
2005 referendums
2005 in Saint Helena
Constitutional referendums